Bank West may refer to:

Bank of the West,  bank in California
Bankwest, bank in Australia
Zag Bank, bank in Canada that previously traded as Bank West

See also
West Bank (disambiguation)